Karumandurai  is a developed village situated in East Salem district in Kalvarayan Hills., Tamil Nadu - India. 
This is a town for surrounding areas around 100+ villages. Colloquially called Kalrayan Hills,  further divided as Chinna Kalrayan and Periya Kalrayan Hills. In Periya Kalrayan Hills famous temple called Kariyaramar Temple in village Kariyakoil. It is beautiful hill station which has famous for nurseries, fruit farm. This fruit orchards 2nd largest in South Asia around 1054 acres.
SCHOOLS  Govt Tribals Residential Higher Secondary School, Govt Tribals Primary School, Govt ITI,

Cultivation

Main source of income from agriculture's Suger cane,  Tapioca, Vegetables(Tomato,cabbage,beetroot, carrot), Paddy and millets-pearl millet, finger millet, varagu(kodo), horticulture, live stocks, pepper and coffee.

Tourist places

It is situated around 65 km from Salem in that stretch 10 km are hill road. Once you reach this small town we will not feel as hill station because surroundings 5 km not much slope area. From here you can reach Kallakuruchi around 50 km with ghats road and few hairpins. Tourist spots on this road are small lake with boating, Periyar falls on road itself and further inside forest Megan falls.

References

 

Villages in Salem district